Doumbala is a department or commune of Kossi Province in western Burkina Faso. Its capital lies at the town of Doumbala. According to the 1996 census the department has a total population of 26,124.

Towns and villages

 Doumbala	(1 897 inhabitants) (capital)
 Bamperla	(579 inhabitants)
 Bangassi-Bobo	(498 inhabitants)
 Bangassi-Illa	(1 333 inhabitants)
 Bangassi-Mamoudoud	(334 inhabitants)
 Bankuy	(142 inhabitants)
 Bassam	(169 inhabitants)
 Boanekuy	(793 inhabitants)
 Bokuy	(212 inhabitants)
 Boukuy	(409 inhabitants)
 Dakuy	(864 inhabitants)
 Henlekuy	(615 inhabitants)
 Karekuy	(440 inhabitants)
 Kimba	(279 inhabitants)
 Kini-Kini	(171 inhabitants)
 Koa	(1 133 inhabitants)
 Kodara	(1 291 inhabitants)
 Kolonzo	(1 291 inhabitants)
 Konkuy-Boho	(306 inhabitants)
 Konkuy-Koro	(1 589 inhabitants)
 Kourkuy	(334 inhabitants)
 Lanfiera	(528 inhabitants)
 Montionkuy	(734 inhabitants)
 Mounakoro	(1 501 inhabitants)
 Nian	(1 815 inhabitants)
 Porokuy	(361 inhabitants)
 Saint-Camille	(285 inhabitants)
 Saint-Martin	(785 inhabitants)
 Saint-Paul	(157 inhabitants)
 Saworokuy	(405 inhabitants)
 Simbora	(1 066 inhabitants)
 Teni	(1 878 inhabitants)
 Teni-Peulh	(267 inhabitants)
 Tiourkuy	(249 inhabitants)
 Wanzan	(465 inhabitants)
 Zekuy	(949 inhabitants)

References

Departments of Burkina Faso
Kossi Province